Cyclicoporidae is a family of bryozoans belonging to the order Cheilostomatida.

Genera:
 Cyclicopora Hincks, 1884

References

Cheilostomatida